Daliao is a terminus of the Orange line of Kaohsiung MRT in Daliao District, Kaohsiung City, Taiwan.

Station overview
The station is an at-grade, two-level station with an island platform and two exits. It is 148 meters long and is designed to handle 8,299 people/hour (2,915 people on the platform). There is a taxi stand by exit 1.

Station layout

Exits
Exit 1: Zhongxing Village (west side of station)
Exit 2: Qianzhuang Village (east side of station)

Around the station
 Fooyin University

References

2008 establishments in Taiwan
Kaohsiung Metro Orange line stations
Railway stations opened in 2008